Charles Cheruiyot (born December 2, 1964) is a retired Kenyan long-distance runner.

Charles attended Mount St. Mary's University. In his special event, the 5000 metres, he reached the semi-final at the 1983 World Championships in Athletics. At the 1984 Summer Olympics he finished 6th, and at the 1988 Summer Olympics he again reached the semi final.

His twin brother Kipkoech Cheruiyot had success as a middle-distance runner.

External links
 
 Sports-Reference.com profile

1964 births
Living people
Kenyan male long-distance runners
Olympic athletes of Kenya
Athletes (track and field) at the 1984 Summer Olympics
Athletes (track and field) at the 1988 Summer Olympics
World Athletics Championships athletes for Kenya
Universiade medalists in athletics (track and field)
Kenyan twins
Twin sportspeople
Universiade silver medalists for Kenya
Medalists at the 1989 Summer Universiade